Zandile Majozi is a South African politician who became an MP in the South African parliament at the 2019 general election as a representative of the Inkatha Freedom Party.

Parliamentary career
In 2019, Majozi stood for election to the South African National Assembly as 5th on the IFP's regional to national candidate list. At the election, she won a seat in the National Assembly.

Upon election, she was assigned to the following committees: the Committee on Multi-Party Women's Caucus,
the Portfolio Committee on Communications, and the Portfolio Committee on Police.

On 21 June 2021, she became a member of the Committee for Section 194 Enquiry, which will determine Public Protector Busisiwe Mkhwebane's fitness to hold office.

References

External links
Ms Zandile Majozi at Parliament of South Africa

Living people
Year of birth missing (living people)
Place of birth missing (living people)
Zulu people
People from Gauteng
Inkatha Freedom Party politicians
Members of the National Assembly of South Africa
Women members of the National Assembly of South Africa